Lucy Taxis Shoe Meritt (born August 7, 1906, in Camden, New Jersey; died Austin, Texas, April 13, 2003) was a classical archaeologist and a scholar of Greek architectural ornamentation and mouldings.

Biography
Born in Camden, New Jersey, Lucy Shoe Meritt was the daughter of William Napoleon Shoe and Mary Esther Dunning Shoe. She studied at Bryn Mawr College (A.B. 1927, M.A. 1928, Ph.D. 1935).  She continued her studies at the American School of Classical Studies in Athens from 1929 to 1934.  From 1937 to 1950 Meritt taught at Mount Holyoke College. She was twice a fellow of the American Academy in Rome (1937 and 1950).  She married Benjamin Dean Meritt at Princeton, New Jersey, on November 2, 1964. She worked at the Roman site of Cosa and at Serra Orlando (Morgantina) in Sicily.  She served as editor of publications for the American School of Classical Studies in Athens from 1950 until 1972. In 1972, with her husband, Benjamin Dean Meritt's appointment to a professorship at the University of Texas at Austin,  she moved to Austin, Texas, and was a visiting scholar at the University of Texas at Austin from 1973 until her death. Meritt received the Gold Medal Award for Distinguished Archaeological Achievement in 1977 from the Archaeological Institute of America.

The papers and scholarly archive of Lucy Shoe Meritt are preserved as a collection curated by the Alexander Architectural Archives, University of Texas Libraries, University of Texas at Austin.

Lucy Taxis Shoe Meritt died in Austin, Texas, and was buried at Austin Memorial Park Cemetery.

Publications
 Profiles of Greek Mouldings (1936).
 Profiles of Western Greek Mouldings (1952).
 Etruscan and Roman Republican Mouldings (1965).
 History of the American School of Classical Studies at Athens, 1939-1980 (1984)
 Etruscan and Republican Roman Mouldings (expanded ed., 2000) with Ingrid Edlund-Berry.

References

External links
 Finding Aid to the Lucy Shoe Meritt collection at the Alexander Architectural Archives, University of Texas at Austin
 Finding Aid to the Lucy T. Shoe Meritt Papers at Bryn Mawr College

1906 births
2003 deaths
Classical archaeologists
Mount Holyoke College faculty
Bryn Mawr College alumni
People from Camden, New Jersey
American women archaeologists
20th-century American archaeologists
20th-century American women
American women academics
Historians from New Jersey
21st-century American women